C. americanus may refer to:

 Camponotus americanus, an ant species in the genus Camponotus
 Ceanothus americanus, a plant species
 Coccyzus americanus, a bird species
 Culex americanus, a mosquito species

See also
 Americanus (disambiguation)